Daniel R. von Recklinghausen (January 22, 1925, New York City – August 22, 2011) was an electrical engineer. 

He graduated from Massachusetts Institute of Technology in 1951 with a Bachelor of Science degree in Electrical Engineering. He was a member of Tau Beta Pi, Sigma Xi, and Eta Kappa Nu fraternities.

Von Recklinghausen worked at Electro Audio Dynamics in 1973. In 1975, he was appointed Vice President of Research and Development for KLH, where he patented computer controlled loudspeakers. He was a member of the National Stereophonic Radio Committee. He served the Audio Engineering Society (AES) as president in 1967, and was the journal editor from 1991-2004. 

Von Recklinghausen was an author of numerous articles and publications, and held 24 patents. He was also an avid photographer.

Awards
Fellow, Institute of Electrical and Electronics Engineers (IEEE), 1967, for contributions in the field of high fidelity music reproduction (FM Stereo).
Fellow, Audio Engineering Society, 1962.
Gold Medal, Audio Engineering Society, 1978, for outstanding achievement and contributions in the field of FM receiver technology.
Lifetime Achievement award, Audio Engineering Society, 2005.
Outstanding Young Men of Greater Boston, Boston Junior Chamber of Commerce, 1960.

References

1925 births
2011 deaths
American electrical engineers
Massachusetts Institute of Technology alumni